The Oceanographic Museum (Musée océanographique) is a museum of marine sciences in Monaco-Ville, Monaco.
This building is part of the Institut océanographique, which is committed to sharing its knowledge of the oceans.

History 
The Oceanographic Museum was inaugurated in 1910 by Monaco's modernist reformer, Prince Albert I. who invited to the celebrations not just high officials and celebrities but also the world-leading oceanographers of the day to develop the concept of a future Mediterranean Commission dedicated to oceanography, now called Mediterranean Science Commission. 
Jacques-Yves Cousteau was director from 1957 to 1988. The Museum celebrated its centenary in March 2010, after extensive renovations.

Overview 
The museum is home to exhibitions and collections of various species of sea fauna (starfish, seahorses, turtles, jellyfish, crabs, lobsters, rays, sharks, sea urchins, sea cucumbers, eels, cuttlefish etc.). The museum's holdings also include a great variety of sea related objects, including model ships, sea animal skeletons, tools, weapons etc., as well as a collection of material culture and ritual objects made from, or integrating materials such as pearls, molluscs and nacre.

At the first floor, A Sailor’s Career showcases the work of Prince Albert I. It includes the laboratory from L’Hirondelle, the first of Prince Albert's research yachts. Observations made there led to an understanding of the  phenomenon of anaphylaxis, for which Dr Charles Richet received the Nobel Prize in Physiology or Medicine in 1913.

An aquarium in the basement of the museum presents a wide array of flora and fauna. Four thousand species of fish and over 200 families of invertebrates can be seen. The aquarium also features a presentation of Mediterranean and tropical marine ecosystems.

Numerous artists display their artworks in the museum, such as Damien Hirst and Philippe Pasqua.

Architecture 
This monumental example of highly charged Baroque Revival architecture has an impressive façade above the sea, towering over the sheer cliff face to a height of 279 feet (85.04 m). It took eleven years to build, using 100,000 tons of stone from La Turbie. During construction, the names of twenty well-known oceanographic research vessels personally selected by Prince Albert I were inscribed into the frieze of the museum's façade.

Oceanographic research vessels inscribed on façade

Caulerpa taxifolia 
In 1989, a French marine biologist discovered a patch of a giant, tropical seaweed Caulerpa taxifolia directly under the walls of the museum. The actual source and extent of this exotic introduction remain a matter of controversy.

Gallery

See also

 List of museums in Monaco

References

External links 

Official website (in French) (in English)
Guide to visiting the Museum

Natural history museums
Oceanography
Museums in Monaco
1910 establishments in Monaco
Monaco-Ville
Museums established in 1910